State Route 48 (SR-48) is a highway completely within Salt Lake County in northern Utah that connects Bangerter Highway with I-15 and US-89. The route is laid on portions of 7800 South, Redwood Road, and 7200 South. When the route was formed in 1927, it passed through the center of Midvale on Center Street. However, it was moved north onto 7200 South in 1965 to serve an exit of I-15.

Route description
The road begins at a single-point urban interchange on Bangerter Highway at exit 13 and heads east on 7800 South. After approximately 2 miles, the route turns north onto a concurrency with SR-68 for eight blocks before turning east onto 7000 South. The route turns southeast, crosses the Jordan River and enters Midvale. The road turns into 7200 South and straightens out to the east. A single-point urban interchange occurs with I-15 at exit 297. The highway continues east three blocks before terminating at US-89.

The entire route is included as part of the National Highway System.

History
The state legislature added SR-48 to the state highway system in 1927, connecting Bingham with SR-1 (US-91, now US-89) at Midvale Junction. In order to serve the planned I-15 interchange at 7200 South, SR-48 was moved in 1965 to turn north off Center Street onto Holden and Main Streets in Midvale and then east on 7200 South to US-89. As the city of Bingham de-annexed land, a short extension was made at the west end to the new city limits in 1968, but this and more was abandoned in 1973 to allow the Kennecott Copper Corporation to relocate its guard station. An overlap with SR-68 in West Jordan was added in 2000, rerouting SR-48 to turn north at SR-68 and then east on 7000 South to the former alignment at Main Street in Midvale.

In 2012, the construction of the Mountain View Corridor in West Jordan made the New Bingham Highway discontinuous. As a result, SR-48 was slightly realigned to follow 9000 South and 5600 West to connect segments of the New Bingham Highway.

The portion of SR-48 between the Mountain View Corridor and Bangerter Highway was transferred to the city of West Jordan, splitting SR-48 into two segments. The segment of SR-48 west of the Mountain View Corridor was renumbered as an extension of SR-209. This moved the western terminus of SR-48 to Bangerter Highway.

Major intersections

See also

 List of state highways in Utah

References

External links

048
 048
Streets in Utah